The 1995 AFL draft was held at the conclusion of the 1995 Australian Football League (AFL) season.

The AFL draft is the annual draft of new unsigned players by Australian rules football clubs that participate in the main competition of that sport, the Australian Football League.

Clubs receive picks based on the position in which they finish on the ladder during the season, although these picks can be swapped around by teams for trading players.

1995 pre-draft selections

1995 national draft

1996 pre-season draft

References

AFL Draft
Australian Football League draft